Stoka Krishna Swami has been serving the mission of Srila Prabhupada as a full-time missionary with ISKCON Bangalore since 1989. He served as the president of ISKCON Mysore.

Biography
Stoka Krishna Swami was born in 1960 in Mysuru, India. He completed his Bachelor of Electrical Engineering from REC Nagpur. He worked as a lecturer in Malnad College of Engineering, Hassan. He also worked for Infosys Technologies Ltd. and Tata Boroughs Ltd. He joined ISKCON in 1989. Having headed the activities of ISKCON centers at Mysuru and Chennai, he is currently involved in training and counseling full-time missionaries at ISKCON Bangalore.

Inspiration
The teachings of Srila Prabhupada, the Founder-Acharya of ISKCON.

Srila Prabhupada's biography inspired Stoka Krishna Swami to join the International Society of Krishna Consciousness (ISKCON).

References

External links
 
 
 
 
 

Living people
Engineers from Karnataka
20th-century Indian engineers
20th-century Indian educators
Year of birth missing (living people)